Tugimaantee 18 (ofcl. abbr. T18), also called the Niitvälja–Kulna highway, is a 4.7-kilometre-long national basic road in northwestern Estonia. The highway begins at Niitvälja on national road 8 and ends at Kulna on national road 17.

Route
T18 passes through Lääne-Harju Parish in Harju County.

See also
 Transport in Estonia

References

External links

N18